Clifton House may refer to:

United Kingdom
Clifton House, Belfast, a historic building in Northern Ireland
Clifton House, King's Lynn, a grade I listed building in King's Lynn, Norfolk

United States
Clifton House, Pennsylvania, a historic building in Fort Washington, Pennsylvania
Clifton House Site, overnight stop on the Santa Fe Trail

See also
Bullock-Clifton House
Clifton House Preparatory School